Manoj Jain is an infectious disease physician and a writer. He is an adjunct faculty member at Rollins School of Public Health at Emory University and a contributing health writer for The Washington Post, Huffington Post and The Commercial Appeal. He lives in Memphis, Tennessee. He was running for public office in August 2014 Elections.

Currently advisor to the Memphis-Shelby County COVID-19 Joint Task Force.

During the pandemic he spent months educating himself about novel coronavirus, informing the public in newspaper columns, and encouraging local officials, including the health department, “to prepare for the worst and hope for the best.” He spent nearly every day trying to guide his family, his practice, and his community through a pandemic.

Publications
 Management of Infectious Diseases
 Mahavira: The Hero of Nonviolence, an illustrated children’s story
Melody of India Cuisine: Tasteful New Vegetarian Recipes Celebrating Soy and Tofu in Traditional Indian Foods. 
The Germs Are Potent. But So Is a Kiss, NYTimes

Awards 
His writings have earned him the South Asian Journalists Association's award for the best commentary in 2008 for his article Disparity In Pay Divides Doctors at The Washington Post.

References

External links
 

Living people
American public health doctors
Year of birth missing (living people)